Animal: An International Journal of Animal Bioscience is an academic journal established February 2007 and published monthly by Cambridge University Press.

It is owned by British Society of Animal Science (BSAS), Institut national de recherche pour l’agriculture, l’alimentation et l’environnement (INRAE) and European Association for Animal Production (EAAP).

It is the merge of three journals:
 Animal Science -  (BSAS)
 Animal Research - / (INRA)
 Reproduction, Nutrition, Development - / (INRA)

External links 
 
 animal, Cambridge University Press
 Animal, BSAS
 

Publications established in 2007
Animal science journals
Cambridge University Press academic journals
Academic journals associated with learned and professional societies